Westfield State Owls football is an NCAA Division III college football program that represents Westfield State University in Westfield, Massachusetts.

History

1984 to 2001
From 1984 to 1986, the Owls compiled records of 4–5, 5-5, and 5–4. In 1987, the team compiled a 6–3 record.  The Owls finished the 1980s going 5–4 in 1988, 3–7 in 1989.  The Owls started the 1990s going 3–7 in 1990 for the second year.  The Owls improved every year for the next three years going 4–6 in 1991 6–3 in 1892.  In the 1992 season, the team experienced a heartbreaking loss in triple overtime against UMass Dartmouth.  During the 1992 season, the Owls offense gained an impressive 279 yards per game, a program record that still stands.   The Owls experienced their best season in 10 years going 7–2 with one tie against Hartwick.  This was the best season of the decade. They spent the rest of 90's hovering around .500 with mixed success.  Westfield compiled a 5–5 record in '94, 3–6 in '95, 4–6 in both 1996 and '97.  In 1998, the team compiled a .500 and would cap of the decade going  4–6.  The 2000 season proved to be a heartbreaking season the Owls would go 3-6 losing three games by an average of four points.

2001 to 2003
In 2001, the Owls went undefeated in the regular season, won the Bogan division and met Nichols College in the New England Football Conference championship game which they won 12–0.  However, they came up one point short failing to advance in the NCAA playoffs in a loss to Western Connecticut by an 8–7 score.   They finished the season with a 10–1 record.  In both 2002 and 2003, the Owls again won the Bogan division.  In 2003, the Owls finished 7-3 and advanced to the NEFC championship game for the third straight season. Highlights of the season were a 21–19 victory at Worcester State and a 27-24 come-from-behind homecoming victory over Bridgewater State.  This was the third and last time the Owls won the division title.  In their three-year run, the Owls compiled a 25–7 record.

2004 to present
The Owls finish 5–4 in 2004 and 4–5 in 2005.  In 2006, they had a difficult season going 1–8.  The next year, they compiled a 5–4 record.  In 2008, they had an impressive 7–3 season, coming up just short of capturing a Bogan division title.

Head coaching records

Game scores since 1984

"1984 (4-5)
Curry 21, Westfield 16
Westfield 21, Nichols 14
Plymouth 34, Westfield 6
West. Connecticut 27, Westfield 7
Mass Maritime 29, Westfield 21
Westfield 20, Framingham 0
Maine Maritime 13, Westfield 10
Westfield 20, Bridgewater 0
Westfield 11, WNEC 6

1985 (5-5)
Westfield 30, Fitchburg 0
Westfield 33, Curry 20
Westfield 28, Nichols 0
Plymouth 20, Westfield 0
West. Connecticut 35, Westfield 7
Mass Maritime 28, Westfield 13
Framingham 12, Westfield 0
Westfield 27, Maine Maritime 23
Bridgewater 7, Westfield 0
Westfield 46, WNEC 9

1986 (5-4)
Westfield 34, Fitchburg 0
Curry 20, Westfield 9
Westfield 19, Worcester 2
Westfield 17, Mass Maritime 8
Nichols 19, Westfield 17
Bridgewater 30, Westfield 13
Plymouth 23, Westfield 8
Westfield 15, Framingham 0
Westfield 14, WNEC 10 **

1987 (6-3)
Westfield 20, Nichols 0
Plymouth 17, Westfield 7
Westfield 21, Lowell 14
Westfield 28, WNEC 21
Westfield 28, Framingham 7
Westfield 36, Mass Maritime 16
Worcester 26, Westfield 21
Bridgewater 35, Westfield 7
Westfield 35, Fitchburg 8

1988 (5-4)
Nichols 21, Westfield 7
Westfield 20, Curry 10
Westfield 14, Fitchburg 6
Mass Maritime 15, Westfield 10
Plymouth 20, Westfield 2
Worcester St. 13, Westfield 7
Westfield 21, Bridgewater 16
Westfield 7, SMU 0
Westfield 20, Framingham 15

1989 (3-7)
Nichols 17, Westfield 0
Curry 10, Westfield 7
Westfield 6, Fitchburg 0
Mass Maritime 35, Westfield 27
Plymouth 45, Westfield 0
Westfield 22, Worcester 21
Bridgewater 27, Westfield 7
Westfield 3, SMU 0, 3 OTs
Framingham 28, Westfield 21
WNEC 7, Westfield 0

1990 (3-7)
Nichols, 20, Westfield 14
Curry 32, Westfield 26
Westfield 20, Fitchburg 6
Mass. Maritime 17, Westfield 14
Plymouth 44, Westfield 6
Worcester 12, Westfield 0
Bridgewater 48, Westfield 21
SMU 14, Westfield 13
Westfield 49, Framingham 23
Westfield 7, WNEC 0

1991 (4-6)
Maine Maritime 40, Westfield 28
UMass Lowell 25, Westfield 13
Westfield 26, Worcester 15
Westfield 44, Framingham 35
Bridgewater 45, Westfield 12
Westfield 33, UM-Dartmouth 24
Mass. Maritime 43, Westfield 34
Plymouth 24, Westfield 22
Westfield 12, Fitchburg 6
WNEC 13, Westfield 12

1992 (6-3)
UMass Boston 34, Westfield 20
Westfield 41, Fitchburg 0
Westfield 24, Framingham 6
Westfield 31, MIT 12
Bridgewater 22, Westfield 10
Westfield 29, Worcester 0
Westfield 13, Mass Maritime 10
UMass Dartmouth 21, Westfield 14 (Triple Overtime)
Westfield 22, Maine Maritime 13

1993 (7-2-1)
Westfield, 7, Hartwick 7, tie
Westfield 14, Fitchburg 7
Westfield 28, Framingham 7
Westfield 20, MIT 0
Bridgewater 22, Westfield 8
Westfield 33, Worcester 6
Westfield 27, Mass Maritime 9
Westfield 33, UMass Dart. 14
Maine Maritime 22, Westfield 14

1994 (5-5)
Hartwick 17, Westfield 10
Westfield 34, UMass Boston 0
Westfield 23, Fitchburg 0
Westfield 13, Framingham 3
Westfield 36, MIT 13
Bridgewater 27, Westfield 13
Worcester 34, Westfield 8
Westfield 26, Mass Maritime 19
UMass Dartmouth 21, Westfield 14, (Triple Overtime)
Maine Maritime 48, Westfield 16

1995 (3-6)
Westfield 35 - UMass Boston 0
Westfield 41 - Fitchburg 17
Framingham 10 - Westfield 7
Coast Guard 12 - Westfield 0
Bridgewater 20 - Westfield 3
Worcester 17 - Westfield 6
Mass Maritime 37 - Westfield 6
Westfield 12 - UMass Dartmouth 0
Maine Maritime 14 - Westfield 7

1996 (4-6)
WPI 20 - Westfield 9
Westfield 18 - UMass Boston 17
Westfield 24 - Fitchburg 14
Westfield 20 - Framingham 10
Coast Guard 55 - Westfield 6
Bridgewater 32 - Westfield 17
Worcester 42 - Westfield 0
Mass Maritime 27 - Westfield 26
UMass Dartmouth 41 - Westfield 26
Westfield 21 - Maine Maritime 20

1997 (4-6)
Hartwick 38 - Westfield 25
Westfield 26 - UMass Boston 18
Fitchburg 35 - Westfield 13
Westfield 28 - Framingham 22, OT
Coast Guard 44 - Westfield 28
Bridgewater 55 - Westfield 21
Westfield 19 - Worcester 14
Westfield 28 - Mass Maritime 26
UMass Dartmouth 48 - Westfield 23
Maine Maritime 54 - Westfield 28

1998 (5-5)
Hartwick 32 - Westfield 0
Westfield 27 - WNEC 25
Westfield 21 - Fitchburg 0
Mass Maritime 21 - Westfield 20
Westfield 13 - Framingham 0
Maine Maritime 26 - Westfield 13
Bridgewater 18 - Westfield 6
Westfield 14 - UMass Boston 7
Westfield 16 - Nichols 14
Worcester 24 - Westfield 13

1999 (4-6)
Hartwick 27 - Westfield 15
WNEC 28 - Westfield 21
Fitchburg 34 - Westfield 20
Mass Maritime 14 - Westfield 9
Westfield 31 - Framingham 13
Westfield 14 - Maine Maritime 13
Bridgewater 49 - Westfield 19
Westfield 52 - UMass Boston 14
Nichols 35 - Westfield 13
Westfield 31 - Worcester 26

2000 (3-6)
WNEC 26 - Westfield 6
Fitchburg 7 - Westfield 3
Mass Maritime 9 - Westfield 7
Westfield 28 - Framingham 14
Westfield 47 - Maine Maritime 8
Bridgewater 38 - Westfield 20
Westfield 27 - UMass Boston 12
Nichols 30 - Westfield 3
Worcester State 14 - Westfield State 9

2001 (10-1)
Westfield 20 - WNEC 13
Westfield 28 - Fitchburg 15
Westfield 27 - Mass Maritime 0
Westfield 37 - Framingham 20
Westfield 34 - Maine Maritime 0
Westfield 27 - Bridgewater 19
Westfield 28 - Mount Ida 6
Westfield 14 - Nichols 7
Westfield 34 - Worcester State 30
Westfield 12 - Nichols 0 (NEFC Championship Game)
Western Connecticut 8 - Westfield 7 (NCAA Tournament)

2002 (8-3)
Westfield 30 - WNEC 0
Wesfield 40 - Nichols 13
Westfield 19 - Fitchburg 7
Westfield 17 - Worcester State 13
Westfield 54 - Mass Maritime 0
Westfield 28 - Bridgewater 10
Westfield 42 - Framingham 0
Westfield 34 - Maine Maritime 8
Curry 13 - Westfield 12
UMass Dartmouth 16 - Westfield 0 (NEFC Championship Game)
Cortland State 30 - Westfield 7 (ECAC Tournament)

2003 (7-3)
Westfield 28 - WNEC 3
Nichols 33 - Westfield 28
Westfield 30 - Fitchburg 27
Westfield 21 - Worcester State 19
Westfield 21 - Mass Maritime 10
Westfield 27 - Bridgewater 24
Westfield 36 - Framingham 6
Westfield 43 - Maine Maritime 14
Curry 33 - Westfield 7
Curry 36 - Westfield 0 (NEFC Championship Game)

2004 (5-4)
WNEC 28 - Westfield 21
Westfield 22 - Nichols 7
Fitchburg 22 - Westfield 15
Westfield 27 - Worcester State 3
Westfield 38 - Mass Maritime 4
Bridgewater 27 - Westfield 0
Westfield 28 - Framingham 12
Westfield 17 - Maine Maritime 14
Curry 34 - Westfield 7

2005 (4-5)
Westfield 14 - WNEC 13
Westfield 16 - Nichols 14
Fitchburg 6 - Westfield 0, Triple Overtime
Worcester State 47 - Westfield 7
Westfield 14 - Mass Maritime 0
Bridgewater 32 - Westfield 7
Westfield 10 - Framingham 2
Maine Maritime 21 - Westfield 11
Curry 31 - Westfield 11

2006 (1-8)
WNEC 31 - Westfield 3
Curry 27 - Westfield 0
Coast Guard 35 - Westfield 21
Maine Maritime 14 - Westfield 11
Mass Maritime 15 - Westfield 13
Westfield 33 - Framingham 0
Bridgewater 28 - Westfield 13
Fitchburg 7 - Westfield 6
Worcester 20 - Westfield 16

2007 (5-4)
Westfield 34, WNEC 21
Curry 42, Westfield 27
Coast Guard 42, Westfield 14
Maine Maritime 21, Westfield 14
Westfield 18, Mass Maritime 10
Westfield 36, Framingham 29
Westfield 21, Bridgewater 14
Fitchburg 49, Westfield 40
Westfield 7, Worcester State 0

2008 (6-4)
Westfield 13, Nichols 10
Westfield 23, WNEC 21
Curry 42, Westfield 16
Coast Guard 16, Westfield 13
Maine Maritime 33, Westfield 28
Westfield 34, Mass. Maritime 3
Westfield 27, Framingham 0
Bridgewater 35, Westfield 21
Westfield 37, Fitchburg 30
Westfield 41, Worcester State 0

2009 (7-3)
Westfield 33, Nichols 13
Westfield 21, WNEC 6
Curry 7, Westfield 6
Coast Guard 8, Westfield 5
Maine Maritime 21, Westfield 13
Westfield 13, Mass. Maritime 7
Westfield 21, Framingham 2
Westfield 28, Bridgewater 19
Westfield 32, Fitchburg 6
Westfield 33, Worcester State 16

2010 (5-5)
Westfield 43, Nichols 21
Montclair State 34, Westfield 0
WNEC 17, Westfield 10
Worcester State 30, Westfield 18
Westfield 15, Bridgewater 0
Maine Maritime 42, Westfield 21
Westfield 26, Coast Guard 15
Framingham 48, Westfield 17
Westfield 28, Mass. Maritime 14
Westfield 17, Fitchburg 14

References

External links